Holiday Lakes is an unincorporated community and census-designated place in Huron County, Ohio, United States. Its population was 749 as of the 2010 census. Ohio State Route 99 passes through the community.

Geography

Demographics

References

Unincorporated communities in Huron County, Ohio
Unincorporated communities in Ohio
Census-designated places in Huron County, Ohio
Census-designated places in Ohio